"Smile" is a song by American rapper and singer Juice Wrld and Canadian singer the Weeknd. It was released on August 7, 2020, as the sixth single from the former's posthumous third studio album Legends Never Die. On the day of the single's release, an updated version of the album featuring the song was released.

Background and release
In mid 2018, an early demo of the track that only had Higgins' vocals on it leaked and quickly became one of his most popular leaks amongst fans. On September 10, 2019, Juice Wrld first revealed his interest in making a track with the Weeknd via Twitter, in a tweet saying "Me and The Weeknd would make a diamond record..." The song's 2018 demo was first leaked in July 2020, under the title "Sad". Nearly a month after the release of Juice Wrld's posthumous third studio album Legends Never Die, on August 4, 2020, the Weeknd announced that a collaboration between the two artists was on the way soon, tweeting out "XO + 999 Thursday Night". Shortly before the song's release, on August 6, 2020, the Weeknd announced the single's title as being "Smile", with the artist upon the song's release, later on stating that he wished Juice Wrld could be alive at the moment to celebrate the song's release. An updated version of Legends Never Die featuring the song was also released alongside the single.

Lyrics and composition
The lyrics of the song revolve around Juice Wrld and the Weeknd speaking about their inner demons, heartbreak and their willingness to make sacrifices in order to make their relationship work with their partner. In the song, Juice Wrld unknowingly foreshadows and references his 2019 death through the line "Devil on my shoulder telling me I'll die soon, I don't really want that to impact you." The single's composition purposely highlights and attempts to uplift the duo's vocals, with it featuring a simple sonic bass drop that emphasizes hi-hats, timely claps, and a heavy bass drum underneath their vocals.

Music videos
The lyric video for "Smile" was released alongside the song on August 7, 2020. The visual follows David Garibaldi in various shots, painting portraits of Juice Wrld and the Weeknd while the song's lyrics appear on the bottom center of the footage. An official animated video was later released on August 11, 2020, which showcases Juice Wrld and the Weeknd in the afterlife. The video contains references to previous visuals done by KDC Visions, with the music video featuring the car and landscape from the official video of the song "Wishing Well".

Commercial performance
The single charted within the top 40 of various nations worldwide, with it reaching the top ten in Australia, Canada, and the United States.

Credits and personnel
Credits adapted from Tidal.
 Jarad Higgins – vocals, songwriting, composition
 Abel Tesfaye – vocals, songwriting, composition 
 Taz Taylor – songwriting, composition, production
 Cxdy – songwriting, composition, production
 Nicholas Mira – songwriting, composition, production

Charts

Weekly charts

Year-end charts

Certifications

Release history

References

External links
 

2020 singles
2020 songs
Animated music videos
Juice Wrld songs
The Weeknd songs
Songs written by Juice Wrld
Songs written by the Weeknd
Songs released posthumously
Interscope Records singles
Song recordings produced by Taz Taylor (record producer)
Songs written by Taz Taylor (record producer)
Songs written by Nick Mira